Euroinnova International Online Education is a business school specializing in online courses for further education up to a master's degree. It was founded in Granada, Spain in the year 2000. The school is currently based in the United States, and has a presence in six countries in Latin America: Argentina, Chile, Colombia, Mexico, Peru, and Venezuela.

Demographics and statistics 
As of 2022, Euroinnova offers more than 19,000 online courses. Based on a 2014 report, Euroinnova reached 150,000 pupils divided into more than 70 different nationalities. Since 2010, Euroinnova on average enrolls more than 25,000 students per year. Euroinnova USA has over a hundred students.

Associations 
Euroinnova International Online Education is an associated member of the International Commission on Distance Education (UNESCO), and collaborates with the Spanish Professional Association of Naturopathy and Biotherapy (APENB). Euroinnova is also Institutional Member of the Spanish Society of Education (SEP) and features Trust Mark Online.

References

External links 
 

Business schools in Spain
2000 establishments in Spain
Granada
Educational institutions established in 2000